Alejandro Enrique Moreno Riera (born July 8, 1979) is a Venezuelan former professional footballer who played as a forward, and who is a television commentator for ESPN FC, ESPN Deportes and ESPN Latin America. Moreno won three MLS Cups during his professional career. Moreno was chosen in 2021 to work as a commentator in the 2020 European Championship.

Club career

College
Moreno spent a year in Texas at age 12 and spent succeeding summers there before earning a scholarship for four years of college soccer at UNC Greensboro. He finished his college career fourth on the team's all-time scoring lists, with 65 goals and 25 assists, having been named first team NSCAA All-South all four years with the team.

Professional
After completing his career at Greensboro, Moreno was drafted 27th overall in the 2002 MLS SuperDraft by the Los Angeles Galaxy. He played sparingly in his rookie season, but developed into an excellent sparkplug coming off the bench in his second season, when he registered six goals and two assists in 1,117 minutes of playing time.

Although Moreno exhibited a good deal of promise in 2003, he was not able to earn a consistent starting role with the Galaxy because of a logjam at the forward position, which included Guatemalan star Carlos Ruiz and former US international Jovan Kirovski, as well as recent acquisition Joseph Ngwenya. In 2004, Moreno again registered six goals and two assists, this time in 1,297 minutes. He was traded to San Jose Earthquakes in the offseason in a four-player deal. In his lone season with the Quakes, Moreno scored eight goals with four assists. Along with the rest of his Earthquakes teammates, he moved to Houston for the 2006 season.

Moreno was traded to Columbus Crew on May 10, 2007, in exchange for Joseph Ngwenya. He scored the first goal in the 2008 MLS Cup for Columbus, who eventually won the game 3-1 against New York Red Bulls.

Moreno was selected by Philadelphia Union in the 2009 MLS Expansion Draft on 25 November 2009.

On November 24, 2010, Moreno was selected by Vancouver Whitecaps FC in the 2010 MLS Expansion Draft, but was immediately traded to Chivas USA, along with Alan Gordon, in exchange for allocation money and an international roster spot.

Moreno remained with Chivas USA through the 2012 season. After the conclusion of the 2012 season, Chivas USA declined the 2013 option on Moreno's contract and he entered the 2012 MLS Re-Entry Draft. Moreno became a free agent after he went undrafted in both rounds of the draft. In February 2013, he joined the Philadelphia Union as a television commentator, ending his playing career.

International career
Moreno's performances in MLS saw him receive call-ups for the Venezuela national team. He made his first appearance for the senior team on February 18, 2004, against Australia. Due to his high quality of form during the 2008 MLS season, Moreno was again called up to the Venezuela national team for some 2010 FIFA World Cup qualification matches, scoring against Ecuador on October 15, 2008, in a 3–1 win.

Media career
In 2013, ESPN FC hired Moreno as a color commentator and analyst. He frequently covers Liga MX and Mexico national football team games on ESPN's English-language networks. In 2014, he served as color commentator for the Philadelphia Union of Major League Soccer.

Career statistics

|-
| 1. || August 20, 2008 || José Antonio Anzoátegui, Puerto La Cruz, Venezuela ||  || 4–0 || 4–1 || Friendly
|-
| 2. || October 15, 2008 || Estadio Olímpico José Antonio Anzoátegui, Puerto La Cruz, Venezuela ||  || 2–1 || 3–1 || 2010 FIFA World Cup qualification
|-
| 3. || March 25, 2011 || Catherine Hall Stadium, Montego Bay, Jamaica ||  || 0–2 || 0–2 || Friendly
|}

Honors
Los Angeles Galaxy
 MLS Cup: 2002
 Supporters' Shield: 2002

San Jose Earthquakes
 Supporters' Shield: 2005

Houston Dynamo
 MLS Cup: 2006

Columbus Crew
 MLS Cup: 2008
 Supporters' Shield: 2008, 2009

References

External links

 
 
 ESPN staff bio

1979 births
Living people
Sportspeople from Barquisimeto
Venezuelan footballers
Venezuelan expatriate footballers
Venezuelan expatriate sportspeople in the United States
LA Galaxy players
San Jose Earthquakes players
Houston Dynamo FC players
Columbus Crew players
Philadelphia Union players
Chivas USA players
Expatriate soccer players in the United States
UNC Greensboro Spartans men's soccer players
Venezuela international footballers
2011 Copa América players
Major League Soccer players
LA Galaxy draft picks
Association football forwards
Major League Soccer broadcasters